Saymai Paladsrichuay (born August 4, 1987) is a retired Thai indoor volleyball player. She is a member of the Thailand women's national volleyball team.

Clubs

As a volleyball player
  Khon Kaen (2005–2008)
  Yesilyurt (2008–2009)
  Idea Khonkaen (2010–2013)
  Cosmo Chiang Rai (2015–2016)

As a coach assistant
  Khonkaen Star (2016–present)

Awards

Individuals
 2006 Thailand League "Best Scorer]]
 [[2006 Women's Volleyball Thailand League#Awards|2006 Thailand League "Best Server
 2003 Asian Youth Championship - "Best Scorer"

Club
 2006 Thailand League -  Third place, with Khon Kaen
 2007–08 Thailand League -  Champion, with Khon Kaen
 2012–13 Thailand League -  Champion, with Idea Khonkaen

References

External links
 FIVB Biography

1987 births
Living people
Saymai Paladsrichuay
Volleyball players at the 2006 Asian Games
Saymai Paladsrichuay
Yeşilyurt volleyballers
Thai expatriate sportspeople in Turkey
Thai autobiographers
Saymai Paladsrichuay
Saymai Paladsrichuay
Southeast Asian Games medalists in volleyball
Women autobiographers
Competitors at the 2005 Southeast Asian Games
Competitors at the 2007 Southeast Asian Games
Saymai Paladsrichuay
Saymai Paladsrichuay
Saymai Paladsrichuay
Expatriate volleyball players in Turkey